The women's triathlon was part of the triathlon at the 2008 Summer Olympics programme. It was the third appearance of the event, which was established in 2000. The competition was held on Monday, August 18, 2008 at the Triathlon Venue at the Ming Tomb Reservoir in Shisanling. Fifty-five triathletes from thirty nations competed.

For the first time in Olympic history, all three medalists finished the race in less than two hours.

Competition format
The race was held over the "international distance" (also called "Olympic distance") and consisted of  swimming, road cycling, and  road running.

Results

* Including Transition 1 (swimming-to-cycling) and T2 (cycling-to-running), roughly a minute. 
No one is allotted the number 13.
LAP - Lapped by the leader on the cycling course.

Gallery

References

External links
NBC Olympics – Triathlon

Triathlon at the 2008 Summer Olympics
Olympics
2008 in women's sport
Women's events at the 2008 Summer Olympics